Setiabudi 13 Case is a cold case of unsolved murder of an unidentified mutilated man found on 23 November 1981 on the sidewalk of Jalan Jenderal Sudirman, Setiabudi, South Jakarta. Due to the extreme violence and uncertainty of the case, this case is considered as the first mutilation case in modern Indonesian crime history, one of the most gruesome, and one of the most mysterious cases in Indonesia. The case is called "Setiabudi 13" since the mutilated body was found in 13 pieces and was found in Setiabudi district, South Jakarta.

Mun'im Idris, a forensic expert that performed the autopsy of the body, said that it was the most brutal, vicious, and the most haunting case he had ever handled. According to Idris, this gruesome case is very disturbing, because despite there were plenty of forensic clues, e.g. victim's fingerprints and face was quite intact and it should be identifiable, the police has been unable to uncover the victim's identity.

Chronology
In the morning on 23 November 1981, two security guards of PT Garuda Mataram Motor found two cardboard boxes on the sidewalk of Jalan Jenderal Sudirman, Setiabudi, South Jakarta, right across Wisma Arthaloka building (today Bank Muamalat building). The two cardboard boxes attracted the attention of the two security guards because the boxes give off foul stench and was surrounded by flies. The two security guards immediately reported the discovery of the suspicious cardboard boxes to a policeman who was directing the traffic nearby. However, because the policeman was busy, this report was ignored.

The two boxes continued to lie on the side of the road until it were approached by two homeless garbage scavenger whom subsequently opened the boxes. When opened, they found a mutilated body; the first box contained thirteen bones and a head, in which the flesh were removed from the bones. The severed head however, was quite intact. The second box contained 180 pieces of human flesh, including internal organs such as lung, liver, and spleen. Some body markings such as fingerprints, palms, foot soles, and parts of face and head were not removed, meanwhile body parts such as anus, bladder and pancreas were missing.

Autopsy result
The autopsy of the body was carried out for approximately two hours. Mun'im Idris said that the victim was slaughtered systematically and slashed in the similar fashion of a "spit roasted goat". According to the investigation, the unidentified male victim was estimated to be 18 to 21 years old, had a height of 165 cm, had the condition of phimosis, has a sturdy body and slightly overweight. The victim was killed and mutilated about two or one day prior the body were found. 

According to Idris, the victim was killed by stabbing using knife due to wounds marks on the chest, back and abdomen. After the victim was murdered, in less than 24 hour it was exposed to water due to the wrinkling of the fingertips. The bones are clean and the flesh pieces are free from blood as if it was cleanse with water, which suggested that the mutilation was possibly done in a bathroom. According forensic doctor estimation, the slaughter and mutilation was took place between 21 November to the early dawn of 22 November 1981.

The fingerprint test results did not match any existing fingerprint database. According to the estimation of the crime investigator, the mutilations were presumably carried out by more than one person and estimated lasted for about 3 to 4 hours.

Hundreds of people who claimed the lost of family and relatives came during the identification process. However, from various information collected by the police the body did not matched any person being sought. The identification process lasted until 27 November 1981. The victim was buried in Tegal Alur cemetery in Kalideres, West Jakarta. Until now, this case is remain unsolved.

References

 Bibliography

 

1981 in Indonesia
1981 crimes in Indonesia
Unsolved murders in Indonesia